Happy Ness: The Secret of the Loch is a children's cartoon that aired in 1995, centering on a community of Loch Ness monsters that could fly and swim. It lasted 13 episodes, and originated in the United Kingdom, but also airing in Sweden and other countries on Fox Kids and Fox Kids Play. It was co-produced by Abrams Gentile Entertainment, C&D (Créativité et Développement; the same company who produced The Bots Master), and AB Productions. In the United States, it was syndicated by Active Entertainment.

Characters

Nessies

Good Nessies

Happy Ness
Kind Ness
Lovely Ness
Silly Ness
Cool Ness
Bright Ness
Brave Ness
Smart Ness
Loud Ness
Creative Ness
Sad Ness
Elliot Ness
Rich Ness
Helpful Ness
Cute Ness
Glad Ness
Reckless Ness
Gorgeous Ness
Sweet Ness
Forgetful Ness
Angry Ness
Hopeless Ness
Outrageous Ness
Useful Ness
Busy Ness
Prompt Ness
Delightful Ness

Evil Nessies
Pompous Ness
Selfish Ness
Greedy Ness
Bad Ness
Devious Ness
Sneaky Ness
Mean Ness
Dark Ness

Humans
Halsey McJoy
Hayden McJoy
Hannah McJoy 
Sir Angus Prize
Mr. McJoy

Episodes
 There's a World of Nessies
 Circle of De-light
 A Surprise for Sir Prize
 It's Not Bad to Be Sad
 No Time for Silly Ness
 S.U.R.F.'s Up
 Courangeous Outrageous
 Money Can't Buy Happyness
 Sneak Attack
 Jewel of the Pool
 Time is of the Nessence
 Stand Tall, No Matter How Big or Small
 Spread a Little Happy Ness

Home media
Happy Ness: The Secret of the Loch was first released on VHS in 1996 by Just for Kids Home Video formally known as Celebrity Home Entertainment, shortly before the video production company ended in 1997. Nine episodes of the series were released on VHS between 1996 and 1997.

VHS releases:

Happy Ness: The Secret of the Loch - Vol 1

Episodes:
There's a World of Nessies
A Surprise for Sir Prize
It's Not Bad to Be Sad
Money Can't Buy Happyness
Stand Tall, No Matter How Big or Small

Happy Ness: The Secret of the Loch - Vol 2

Episodes:
Circle of De-light
No Time for Silly Ness
S.U.R.F.'s Up
Courangeous Outrageous

References

External links

British children's animated fantasy television series
British children's animated musical television series
1990s British animated television series
French children's animated fantasy television series
French children's animated musical television series
1990s French animated television series
Loch Ness Monster in television
Television series by Saban Entertainment